Oruza albocostaliata, the white edge moth, is a moth in the family Erebidae. The species was first described by Alpheus Spring Packard in 1876. It is found in North America.

The MONA or Hodges number for Oruza albocostaliata is 9025.

References

Further reading

External links

 

Boletobiinae
Articles created by Qbugbot
Moths described in 1876